Alfio Rapisarda (born 3 September 1933) is an Italian prelate of the Catholic Church who worked in the diplomatic service of the Holy See from 1962 to 2008, with the title of apostolic nuncio from 1979.

Biography
Alfio Rapisarda was born on 3 September 1933 in Zafferana Etnea, Province of Catania, Italy. He was ordained a priest on 14 July 1957. He earned a doctorate in canon law and entered the diplomatic service of the Holy See in 1962. He completed the course of studies at the Pontifical Ecclesiastical Academy in 1960. His early assignments included stints in Honduras, Brazil, France, Yugoslavia, and Lebanon.

On 22 April 1979, Pope John Paul II appointed him Titular Archbishop of Cannae and Apostolic Nuncio to Bolivia and consecrated him a bishop on 27 May.

On 29 January 1985, John Paul named him Apostolic Nuncio to Zaire (now the Democratic Republic of the Congo), Apostolic Nuncio to Brazil on 2 June 1992, and Apostolic Nuncio to Portugal on 12 October 2002. In 2004 Portugal and the Holy See signed a new concordat, replacing an outdated one from 1940.

Pope Benedict XVI accepted his resignation on 8 November 2008.

See also 

Apostolic Nunciature
Apostolic Nuncio
Catholic Church in Africa
List of diplomatic missions of the Holy See
List of heads of the diplomatic missions of the Holy See
Giovanni D'Aniello
Pontifical Ecclesiastical Academy

External links 

 Catholic Hierarchy - Alfio Rapisarda
Diplomatic Relations of the Holy See
Pontifical Ecclesiastical Academy Alumni : Alfio Rapisarda

References 
 

1933 births
Living people
Apostolic Nuncios to Bolivia
Apostolic Nuncios to the Democratic Republic of the Congo
Apostolic Nuncios to Brazil
Apostolic Nuncios to Portugal
People from Zafferana Etnea
Religious leaders from the Province of Catania